Ranga is a village in the Pathna CD block in the Rajmahal subdivision of the Sahibganj district in the Indian state of Jharkhand.

Geography

Location                                          

Overview
Rajmahal coalfield is shown in the map. The entire area is overwhelmingly rural with only small pockets of urbanisation.

Note: The full screen map is interesting. All places marked on the map are linked and you can easily move on to another page of your choice. Enlarge the map to see what else is there – one gets railway links, many more road links and so on.

Demographics
According to the 2011 Census of India, Ranga a total population of 663, of which 327 (49%) were males and 336 (51%) were females. Population in the age range 0–6 years was 144. The total number of literate persons in Ranga was 342 (65.90% of the population over 6 years).

Civic administration

Police station
Ranga police station serves the Pathna CD block.

References

Villages in Sahibganj district